Ahmad Saba'a (or Ahmed Saba, ; born 24 May 1980) is an Arab-Israeli former footballer.

Biography
Ahmad Saba'a was born in Majd al-Kurum, Israel, to a Muslim-Arab family. His cousin Dia Saba'a is a footballer as well.In 2010, Saba'a founded his own football school, operating in his hometown of Majd al-Kurum. The school has 180 protégés and its main goal is to bring local talent from Majd al-Kurum to the second and first division leagues in Israel. He is a cousin of Israeli professional footballer Dia Saba.

Club career

Hapoel Majd al-Kurum
Ahmad grew up in the youth ranks of Hapoel Majd al-Krum and made his debut for the senior side in 1997. In 1999-00 he was one of the main players in the club's historic promotion to Liga Artzit. He left Majd al-Krum in 2002.

Hapoel Acre
Ahmad moved to Hapoel Acre after signing a one-year contract in July 2002. Even though he played well for the club with 10 goals in 20 league games, he didn't extended his contract with the club.

Hapoel Bnei Lod
In August 2003 he moved to Hapoel Bnei Lod. He helped Lod win two promotions, the first came in the 2004–05 season when the club won Liga Alef, the next season the club won Liga Artzit with Ahmad as one of the factors for the team's success. In 6 seasons with the club Saba'a scored 61 goals in 149 league games.

Maccabi Netanya
On 20 January 2009, Saba'a signed a one-year deal with Maccabi Netanya. His first goal for the club came against Sliema Wanderers in the UEFA Europa League on 23 July 2009.
In his first season with Netanya he became the club's top scorer, a feat repeated the following three seasons.
In June 2011 he extended his contract with the club for 3 more years under a new contract worth $390,000.
In September 2011 he was appointed as the captain of the team.
He was voted as player of the 2011–12 season while securing his position as the top goalscorer with 20 league goals.
On 4 November 2012 he became the first to score a goal in the opening game of the new Netanya Stadium as Netanya won the game 2–1 against Hapoel Tel Aviv.

In 4 seasons with the club Saba'a scored 62 goals in a total of 153 games in all club competitions. Saba'a is in the top ten all time goalscorers of Maccabi Netanya.

Hapoel Ironi Kiryat Shmona
On 16 May 2013, after 4 years with Netanya he moved to Hapoel Ironi Kiryat Shmona for a transfer fee of $120,000. Saba'a signed a two years contract with Kiryat Shmona.

Hapoel Ra'anana
After a terrible half season with Kiryat Shmona, in January 2014 Saba'a moved to Hapoel Ra'anana. One month later he asked to be released from the club.

International career
After reaching the highest levels of Israeli domestic football, Saba'a has said that his goal is to one day play for the Israeli national football team. He has never featured for any national youth football teams. On 18 March 2012 after a lot of media coverage on the fact that he has yet been called for the national team, Saba'a was quoted that he will not play for the Palestine national side - "I won't play for Palestine because I'm an Israeli player".

Statistics

Honours

Team
Liga Alef (2):
1999-00 (Northern division), 2004-05 (Southern division)
Liga Bet (1):
2003-04
 Liga Artzit (1):
2005-06

Individual
Sport 5 Player of the Season (1): 2011–12
Footballer of the Year in Israel (1): 2012
Israeli Premier League - 2011–12 Top Goalscorer (20 goals)

See also
Sports in Israel

References

External links

Profile and statistics on One.co.il

1980 births
Living people
Arab citizens of Israel
Arab-Israeli footballers
Israeli Muslims
Israeli footballers
Association football forwards
Hapoel Majd al-Krum F.C. players
Hapoel Acre F.C. players
Hapoel Bnei Lod F.C. players
Maccabi Netanya F.C. players
Hapoel Ironi Kiryat Shmona F.C. players
Hapoel Ra'anana A.F.C. players
Ihud Bnei Majd al-Krum F.C. players
Hapoel Kafr Kanna F.C. players
Liga Leumit players
Israeli Premier League players
Footballers from Majd al-Krum
Israeli Footballer of the Year recipients